Stannon stone circle (also known as Stannon circle or simply Stannon) is a stone circle located near St. Breward on Bodmin Moor in Cornwall, England.

Description
Stannon takes its name from the nearby farm and is sited between two streams on the gentle slopes of Dinnever Hill, two and a half miles southeast of Camelford. It is overlooked on one side by a massive china clay works that now blights the landscape. The circle's remoteness is part of its charm with only the wild animals of the moor likely to be encountered.

Stannon stone circle is a fine example of a Cornish ring and contains 47 upright stones, 30 recumbent and 2 displaced regularly spaced within an impressive  by  metre circle with four outlying, jagged stones. Like Fernacre, Stannon is an example of Alexander Thom's Type A flattened circle, being noticeably flattened on the north side. The circle dates from either the late Neolithic or early Bronze Age. Aubrey Burl and contended that they may be earlier in date than other circles in the southern area of the moors such as the Stripple stones. John Barnatt suggested this dating and surveyed the site.

Archaeology
Excavations in the area of Stannon Down were carried out by R. J. Mercer in the late 1960s. Houses were constructed of posts, supporting thatched roofs, partitioned with wood with paved or compressed earth floors, incorporating drainage and furniture. Pottery, flint tools were discovered along with a whetstone that suggested the possibility of metal blades. The settlement was estimated to have a population of around one hundred people and dated to the Middle Bronze Age, a later date than suggested for the circle itself.

Alignments
When standing in the supposed centre of Stannon Circle, a point between twenty-two and twenty-eight degrees north from east is marked by Rough Tor. Matthew Gregory Lewis found a relation of these monuments to the neighbouring hills which indicated that they were designed with special consideration of the position of the sunrise at certain times of year. Andy M. Jones reviews studies of the area and called Stannon a Ceremonial Complex.

Literature
 
 
 
 
 Mercer, R. J., The excavation of a Bronze Age hut-circle settlement, Stannon Down, St. Breward, Cornwall., Cornish Archaeology 9, pp. 17–46, 1968.
 Mercer, R. J. & Dimbleby, G. W., Pollen analysis and the hut circle settlement at Stannon Down., Cornish Archaeology 17, 1978.

References

External links

stone-circles.org entry about Stannon stone circle
Cornwall's Archaeological Heritage – field guide to accessible sites – Stannon stone circle
Illustrated entry in the Megalithic Portal
Illustrated entry in the Modern Antiquarian
Pastscape – English Heritage entry about Stannon stone circle

Bodmin Moor
Stone circles in Cornwall